= Legon Botanical Garden =

Botanic garden in Ghana

Coordinates: 05°39′36″N 00°11′15″W

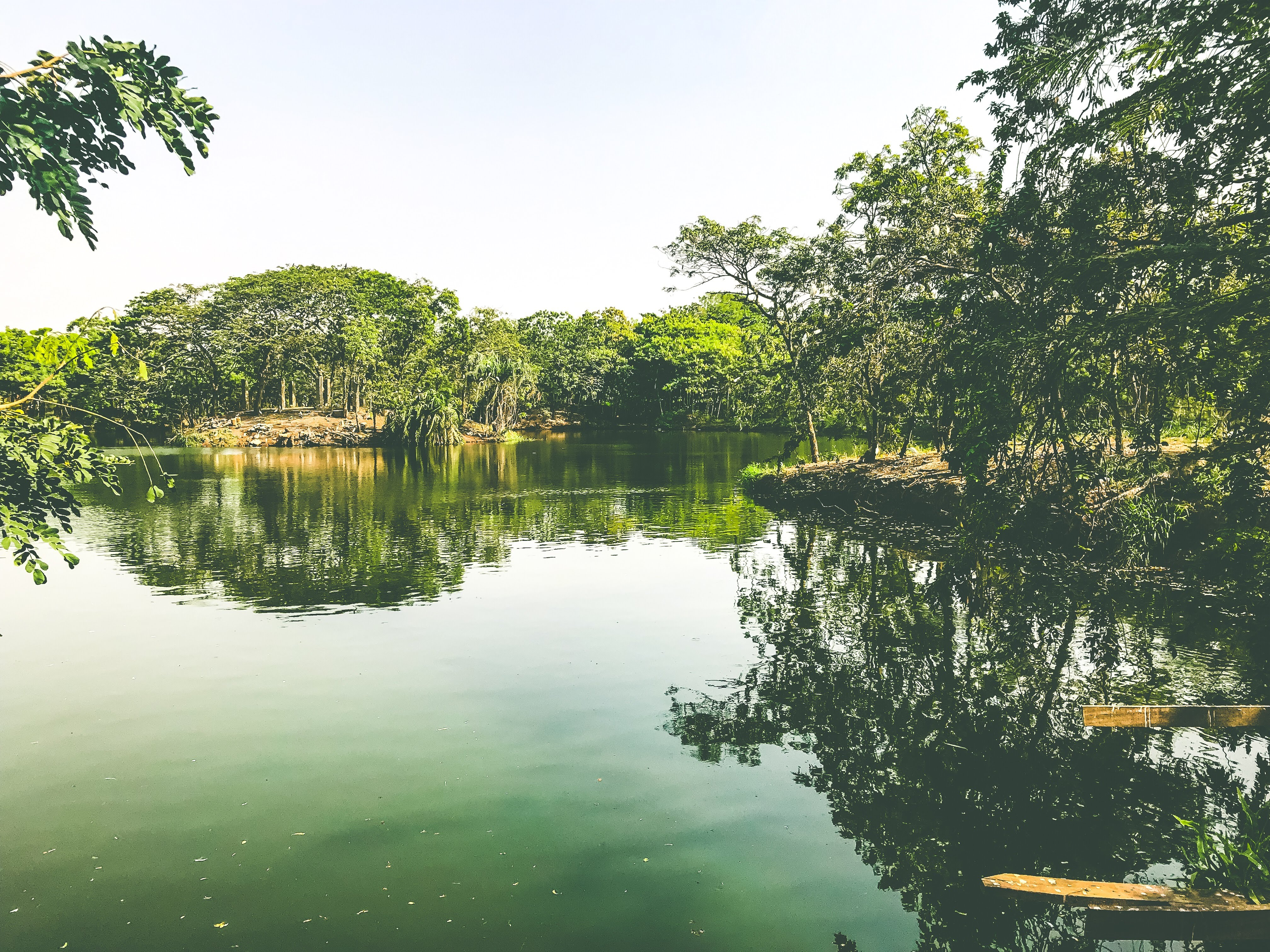
Legon Botanical Garden

The Legon Botanical Gardens is located in the University of Ghana, Accra. It is owned by the University of Ghana and managed by both the Department of Botany and Mulch Company Ltd. It has a natural vegetation of 50 hectares. It was founded in 1950. It is a recreational center with a playground, canopy walks, and natural outdoor space with lakes.

== History ==
The idea that birth the botanical garden was out of love for outdoor and adventure which resulted in a partnership by Mulch Company Limited in partnership with a Dutch company. Legon Botanical Gardens is permanently closed…at least it was on May 15, 2025.

== Activities ==
- Children's Playground
- High Rope Course
- Junior Rope Course
- Canoeing
- Canopy Walk
- The Woodlands
- Bird Watching
- Fishing
- Cycling
